The Chicago Film Critics Association Award for Best Cinematography is one of several categories presented by the Chicago Film Critics Association (CFCA), an association of professional film critics, who work in print, broadcast and online media, based in Chicago. Since the 3rd Chicago Film Critics Association Awards (1990), the award is presented annually. Nominations from 1991 to 1994 are not available. The first Chicago Film Critics Association Award for Best Cinematography went to Dean Semler for his work on Dances with Wolves. The most recent recipient of this award is Kim Ji-yong for Decision to Leave.

Roger Deakins is the cinematographer with the most nominations (13); those have resulted in the most wins (4). Emmanuel Lubezki also has four wins, but from eight nominations. Robert Richardson has eight nominations, which have resulted in two wins. Other notable achievers include Janusz Kamiński (9 nominations, 1 win) and Michael Ballhaus (4 nominations, 1 win). Six cinematographers have been nominated multiple times, but never received the award. These include Conrad Hall, Robert Elswit, and Claudio Miranda; Mandy Walker was the first female cinematographer to have received a nomination for the award. The 16th Chicago Film Critics Association Awards (2003) saw all 15 cinematographers who worked on Winged Migration nominated for Best Cinematography, while the 17th Chicago Film Critics Association Awards (2004) was the first to result in a tie. In 2007, Deakins received two nominations for his work on The Assassination of Jesse James and No Country for Old Men, the first time a cinematographer has been nominated twice in one year.

Winner and nominees

1990s

2000s

2010s

2020s

References
General

 
 

Specific

Chicago Film Critics Association Awards
Awards for best cinematography
Awards established in 1990